Other Side of Truth is a young adult novel about Nigerian political refugees, written by Beverley Naidoo and published by Puffin in 2000. It is set in the autumn of 1995 during the reign in Nigeria of the despot General Abacha, who is waging a campaign of suppression against journalists. A Nigerian girl and her younger brother must leave suddenly after their mother is killed in a failed assassination of their outspoken father. They are sent to London but are abandoned and must cope with the police, social services and school bullies. Naidoo won the 2000 Carnegie Medal, recognising the best children's or young adults' book in English published in the United Kingdom during the preceding school year.

Plot summary

A third person novel presenting the perspective of a 12-year-old girl, Sade Solaja. Her father, Folarin Solaja, is a journalist, one of the most critical of the corrupt regime. The book opens with Sade's memory of hearing the two shots which ended her mother's life, a memory which recurs throughout the novel in her thoughts and dreams. Her memories of Nigeria are often set in contrast to her experiences of an alien England, while her mother's remembered words of wisdom give her comfort and strength. The concentration on Sade's point of view makes many events seem obscure and confusing, just as she experiences them.

After the shooting, Sade's Uncle Tunde urges her father to send her and her 10-year-old brother Femi to safety in England where their Uncle Dele lives. They are forced to pack and leave suddenly and secretly. They fly to London posing as the children of a stranger, Mrs Bankole, so that they can travel on her passport. When their Uncle Dele fails to collect them at the airport, Mrs Bankole abandons them at a coffee shop near Victoria Station. Moneyless and friendless, they wander the streets looking for the art college where their uncle works. They find refuge in a video store, but the owner calls the police, believing them to be vandals. Thus they come to the attention of the authorities. Worried about telling the truth in case it endangers their father, Sade takes refuge in silence and later in half-truths. The children are fostered first by Mrs Graham and her rude and mean son Kevin and later by the Kings, a Jamaican couple whose children have grown up and left. They are sent to different schools. Sade is sent to Avon High School where she meets a girl from Somalia, called Mariam, whose story is similar to Sade's. Marcia and Donna the bullies from school treat Sade very badly, putting pressure on her to steal a turquoise lighter from Mariam's uncle's store. Femi goes to Greenslades Primary School. They become reticent with each other.

It later emerges that Sade's worried father has entered England illegally to look for them but has been arrested. There is a chance that he will be deported to face certain death in Nigeria, especially as the Nigerian police claim he is wanted for his wife's murder. Although Iyawo Jenny and Mr Nathan try their hardest to help Sade's father, things are not working out. Sade braves the freezing night to speak to "Mr. Seven O'clock", the newscaster whom she has seen on television, to bring her father's story to the attention of the British public. The story ends with her father's release for Christmas, though asylum has yet to be granted. They hope that one day they can return safely to Nigeria. Sade misses her grandmother and her former life.

Foreword

The foreword is written by Jon Snow, a real-life "Mr Seven O'clock", who describes the book as "a fast and vivid account of a family's escape from threat and murder.... Not only a marvellous read, but one that refuels the desire for justice and freedom within and beyond our shores".

Sequel
A sequel, "Web of Lies," was published by Amistad Press in 2006. This story deals with the problems faced by Femi while the family is waiting to hear if asylum is to be granted. It was nominated for an Angus Book Award.

Themes

The book consists of several themes. The most important and recognisable are:
 Refugees
 Clash of cultures (adaptation and tolerance)
 Freedom of speech vs. censorship
 Democracy vs. dictatorship
 Discrimination and prejudice
 Human rights
 The truth
 Coming of age
 Asylum
 Loss and displacement

Awards
The Other Side of Truth won a UK Arts Council Award for work in progress. After publication it won the British librarians (CILIP) Carnegie Medal in 2000 as the year's best children's book. A retrospective citation by CILIP says that it "skilfully blends fact and fiction to leave a lasting impression of real issues at work" and describes it as: "An important book which challenges the notion of 'truth' itself." It further describes the writing as "gripping, powerful and evocative".

The Other Side of Truth was silver runner up for the 2000 Nestlé Smarties Book Prize, was named an International Board on Books for Young People Honour Book in 2002, and won the 2002 Jane Addams Children's Book Award.

Allusions to historical events

The novel refers to the execution of Ken Saro-Wiwa and other journalists, which caused an international outcry in 1995. It is set in the immediate aftermath of those executions. Although in the early twenty-first century the military regime no longer controls the country, media rights body Reporters Without Borders says Nigeria is still a violent place for the press, with journalists often suffering beatings, unfair arrests and police raids.

Also referred to in the novel is the civil war in Somalia, which Sade's school friend Mariam experienced as a young child.

See also
This Side of the Truth, a poem by Dylan Thomas.

References

Nestle Smarties Silver Award Winner

External links
  —immediately, first US edition 
 Dossier – The Other Side of Truth (Beverley Naidoo) —Resources at La Clé des langues
 Author's comments at British Council
Author's Carnegie Medal Acceptance Speech
 Teaching resource sheets

 

2000 British novels
2000 children's books
British children's novels
Carnegie Medal in Literature winning works
Novels set in London
Novels set in Nigeria
Fiction set in 1995
Puffin Books books
Refugees and displaced people in fiction